Decorah Municipal Airport  is a city-owned public-use airport located two nautical miles (3.7 km) southeast of the central business district of Decorah, in Winneshiek County, Iowa, United States.

Facilities and aircraft 
It has one runway designated 11/29 with a concrete surface measuring 4,001 by 75 feet (1,220 x 23 m).

For the 12-month period ending July 19, 2007, the airport had 9,100 general aviation aircraft operations, an average of 24 per day. At that time, there were 25 aircraft based at this airport: 96% single-engine and 4% ultralight.

References

External links 
 Decorah Municipal (DEH) at Iowa DOT Office of Aviation
 Aerial photo as of 22 April 1994 from USGS The National Map
 

Airports in Iowa
Transportation buildings and structures in Winneshiek County, Iowa